Corbould is a surname. Notable people with the surname include:

Chris Corbould (born 1958), British special effects coordinator
Edward Henry Corbould (1815–1905), British artist
Henry Corbould (1787–1844), English artist
Linda Corbould, Royal Australian Air Force officer
Gordon Edward Corbould (1847–1926), Canadian lawyer and politician
Richard Corbould (1757–1831), English artist